WZPH (96.7 FM, "The Zephyr") is a low-power radio station broadcasting an oldies format. Licensed to Dade City, Florida, United States, and serving Zephyrhills and Dade City, Florida, the station is currently owned, operated and hosted by Doc Thayer.

External links
The Zephyr Online
The Zephyr on Facebook
 

Oldies radio stations in the United States
Pasco County, Florida
Radio stations established in 2002
ZPH-LP
ZPH-LP
2002 establishments in Florida